Angeliki E. Laiou (Athens, 6 April 1941 – Boston, 11 December 2008) was a Greek-American Byzantinist and politician. She taught at the University of Louisiana, Harvard University, Brandeis University, and Rutgers University. She was Dumbarton Oaks Professor of Byzantine Studies at Harvard from 1981 until her death. From 2000 to 2002, she was also a member of the Hellenic Parliament for the Panhellenic Socialist Movement (PASOK): she served as Deputy Secretary of Foreign Affairs for six months in 2000.

Early life and education
Laiou was born in Athens on 6 April 1941 to a Pontic family, refugees from the Black Sea coast of modern Turkey. She studied at the Athens College and continued her studies in the Philosophy School of the University of Athens (1958–59), where she studied under the Greek Byzantinist Dionysios Zakythinos, who awakened her interest in the Byzantine Empire. She moved to Brandeis University from where she graduated with her BA in 1961, and completed a post-graduate course and received her PhD from Harvard in 1966,  under the supervision of Robert Lee Wolff, one of the leading historians of the Crusades. Her doctoral thesis became the basis for her first book, published in 1972 as Constantinople and the Latins: The Foreign Policy of Andronicus II, 1282–1328.

Academic career
In 1962, she went to lecture at the University of Louisiana, before returning to Harvard, where she stayed from 1966 to 1972, first as instructor and then as assistant professor. She then moved to Brandeis University, where she remained until 1981, becoming distinguished professor. During this period, she also taught at Rutgers College of Rutgers University. In 1981, she returned to Harvard to occupy the prestigious Dumbarton Oaks Professorship of Byzantine Studies, a post she held until her death. In 1985–88, she served as the head of Harvard's History Department and from 1989 until 1998 she headed the distinguished Dumbarton Oaks Research Library and Collection in Washington, DC — the first woman to do so.
With her Laiou pioneered the study of Byzantine and wider medieval society, and especially the role of women. Her article on The role of women in Byzantine society, published in the Jahrbuch der österreichischen Byzantinistik in 1981, "opened a new field for scholars of Byzantium". Her works on Peasant Society in the Late Byzantine Empire (1977) and Mariage, Amour et Parenté à Byzance Aux XIe-XIIIe Siècles (1992) were among the first studies in their field. During her last years, she presided over the compilation of the three-volume Economic History of Byzantium (2002), a definitive work in this until then rather neglected field, followed up a few years later by The Byzantine Economy (2007), her last book.

In her native Greece, she was honoured by being inducted into the Academy of Athens in 1998, only the second woman after the writer Galateia Saranti, and by being decorated with the Commander class of the Order of Honour. Laiou was also a corresponding member of the Académie des Inscriptions et Belles-Lettres, the Austrian Academy of Sciences, a foreign member of the Serbian Academy of Sciences and Arts, a member of the Medieval Academy of America and of the American Academy of Arts and Sciences, and an honorary professor at Nankai University.

Political career
In the April 2000 elections, she was elected as a member of the Hellenic Parliament on the list of the Panhellenic Socialist Movement. In May 2000, she was also named as Deputy Secretary of Foreign Affairs charged with relations with the Greek diaspora. Disappointed with the realities of the job, she resigned the post six months later to resume her academic activities, and resigned her Parliament seat as well in 2002.

Personal life
She was married to Stavros Thomadakis, a former chairman of the Greek Capital Market Commission, whom she later divorced. She is survived by a son, Vassilis Thomadakis.

Diagnosed with thyroid cancer in September 2008, she died in Boston on 11 December 2008.

Major works

References

External links 
 Full list of publications
 Harvard University Faculty of Arts and Sciences Memorial Minute on Angeliki E. Laiou
 Memorial Celebration for Angelikí Laiou, Dumbarton Oaks Director 1989-1998

1941 births
2008 deaths
Greek Byzantinists
American Byzantinists
Scholars of Byzantine history
Members of the Academy of Athens (modern)
Foreign ministers of Greece
Greek MPs 2000–2004
PASOK politicians
Heads of universities and colleges in the United States
Harvard University faculty
Rutgers University faculty
Brandeis University faculty
Academic staff of Nankai University
University of Louisiana at Lafayette faculty
Harvard University alumni
Brandeis University alumni
National and Kapodistrian University of Athens alumni
Fellows of the Medieval Academy of America
Fellows of the American Academy of Arts and Sciences
Members of Academia Europaea
Corresponding members of the Académie des Inscriptions et Belles-Lettres
Corresponding Members of the Austrian Academy of Sciences
Members of the Serbian Academy of Sciences and Arts
Commanders of the Order of Honour (Greece)
Women Byzantinists
Women government ministers of Greece
Women members of the Hellenic Parliament
Writers from Athens
Politicians from Athens
Deaths from thyroid cancer
Deaths from cancer in Massachusetts